Rourururoa Une  is a footballer who plays as a midfielder. He currently plays for Nikao Sokattack F.C. in the Cook Islands Round Cup and the Cook Islands national football team.

References

Living people
Cook Islands international footballers
Association football midfielders
Cook Island footballers
Year of birth missing (living people)